Edward Samuel Miliband (born 24 December 1969) is a British politician serving as Shadow Secretary of State for Climate Change and Net Zero since 2021. He has been the Member of Parliament (MP) for Doncaster North since 2005. Miliband was Leader of the Labour Party and Leader of the Opposition between 2010 and 2015. Alongside his brother, Foreign Secretary David Miliband, he served in the Cabinet from 2007 to 2010 under Prime Minister Gordon Brown.

Miliband was born in the Fitzrovia district of Central London to Polish Jewish immigrants Marion Kozak and Ralph Miliband, a Marxist intellectual and native of Brussels who fled Belgium during World War II. He graduated from Corpus Christi College, Oxford and later from the London School of Economics. Miliband became first a television journalist, then a Labour Party researcher and a visiting scholar at Harvard University, before rising to become one of Chancellor Gordon Brown's confidants and chairman of HM Treasury's Council of Economic Advisers. He was elected to the House of Commons in 2005 and Prime Minister Tony Blair made him Minister for the Third Sector in May 2006. When Brown became Prime Minister in 2007, he appointed Miliband Minister for the Cabinet Office and Chancellor of the Duchy of Lancaster. Miliband was subsequently promoted to the new post of Secretary of State for Energy and Climate Change, a position he held from 2008 to 2010.

After the Labour Party was defeated at the 2010 general election, Brown resigned as Leader of the Labour Party; in September 2010, Miliband was elected to replace him. His tenure as Labour leader was characterised by a leftward shift in his party's policies under the "One Nation Labour" branding, and by opposition to the Conservative–Liberal Democrat coalition government's cuts to the public sector. Miliband also abolished the electoral college system to elect the leader and deputy leader of the Labour Party, and replaced it with a "one member, one vote" system in 2014. He led his party into several elections, including the 2014 European Parliament election.

Following Labour's defeat by the Conservative Party at the 2015 general election, Miliband resigned as leader on 8 May 2015. He was succeeded after a leadership election by Jeremy Corbyn. On 6 April 2020, Corbyn's successor Keir Starmer appointed Miliband Shadow Secretary of State for Business, Energy and Industrial Strategy, succeeding Rebecca Long-Bailey. He became Shadow Secretary of State for Climate Change and Net Zero in the November 2021 British shadow cabinet reshuffle.

Early life and education
Born in University College Hospital in Fitzrovia, London, Miliband is the younger son of immigrant parents. His mother, Marion Kozak, a human rights campaigner and early CND member, is a Polish Jew who survived the Holocaust thanks to being protected by Catholic Poles. His father, Ralph Miliband, was a Belgian-born Polish Jewish Marxist academic whose father fled with him to England during the Second World War. The family lived on Edis Street in Primrose Hill, London. His elder brother, David Miliband, still owns the house as of 2010.

Ralph Miliband left his academic post at the London School of Economics in 1972 to take up a chair at the University of Leeds as a Professor of Politics. His family moved to Leeds with him in 1973; Miliband attended Featherbank Infant School in Horsforth between 1974 and 1977, during which time he became a fan of Leeds United.

Owing to his father's later employment as a roving teacher, Miliband spent two spells living in Boston, Massachusetts, one year when he was seven and one middle school term when he was twelve. Miliband remembered his time in the US as some of his happiest, during which he became a fan of American culture, watching Dallas and following the Boston Red Sox and the New England Patriots.

Between 1978 and 1981, Ed Miliband attended Primrose Hill Primary School, near Primrose Hill, in Camden and then from 1981 to 1989, Haverstock Comprehensive School in Chalk Farm. He learned to play the violin while at school, and as a teenager, he reviewed films and plays on LBC Radio's Young London programme as one of its fortnightly "Three O'Clock Reviewers". After completing his O-levels, he worked as an intern to family friend Tony Benn, the MP for Chesterfield.

In 1989, Miliband gained four A Levels—in Mathematics (A), English (A), Further Mathematics (B) and Physics (B)—and then read Philosophy, Politics and Economics at Corpus Christi College, Oxford. In his first year, he was elected JCR President, leading a student campaign against a rise in rent charges. In his second year he dropped philosophy, and was awarded an upper second class Bachelor of Arts degree. He went on to graduate from the London School of Economics with a Master of Science in Economics.

Early political career

Special Adviser
In 1992, after graduating from the University of Oxford, Miliband began his working career in the media as a researcher to co-presenter Andrew Rawnsley in the Channel 4 show A Week in Politics. In 1993, Shadow Chief Secretary to the Treasury Harriet Harman approached Rawnsley to recruit Miliband as her policy researcher and speechwriter. At the time, Yvette Cooper also worked for Harman as part of Labour's Shadow Treasury team.

In 1994, when Harriet Harman was moved by the newly elected Labour Leader Tony Blair to become Shadow Secretary of State for Employment, Miliband stayed on in the Shadow Treasury team and was promoted to work for Shadow Chancellor Gordon Brown. In 1995, with encouragement from Gordon Brown, Miliband took time out from his job to study at the London School of Economics, where he obtained a master's degree in Economics. After Labour's 1997 landslide victory, Miliband was appointed as a special adviser to Chancellor Gordon Brown from 1997 to 2002.

Harvard
On 25 July 2002, it was announced that Miliband would take a 12-month unpaid sabbatical from HM Treasury to be a visiting scholar at the Center for European Studies of Harvard University for two semesters. He spent his time at Harvard teaching economics, and stayed there after September 2003 for an additional semester teaching a course titled "What's Left? The Politics of Social Justice". During this time, he was granted "access" to Senator John Kerry and reported to Brown on the presidential hopeful's progress. After Miliband returned to the UK in January 2004 Gordon Brown appointed him Chairman of HM Treasury's Council of Economic Advisers as a replacement for Ed Balls, with specific responsibility for directing the UK's long-term economic planning.

Parliament

In early 2005, Miliband resigned his advisory role to HM Treasury to stand for election. Kevin Hughes, then the Labour MP for Doncaster North, announced in February of that year that he would be standing down at the next election due to being diagnosed with motor neurone disease. Miliband applied for selection to be the candidate in the safe Labour seat and won, beating off a close challenge from Michael Dugher, then a SPAD to Defence Secretary Geoff Hoon.

Gordon Brown visited Doncaster North during the general election campaign to support his former adviser. Miliband was elected on 5 May 2005, with 55.5% of the vote and a majority of 12,656. He made his maiden speech in the House of Commons on 23 May, responding to comments made by future Speaker John Bercow. In Tony Blair's frontbench reshuffle in May 2006, he was made Minister for the Third Sector, with responsibility for voluntary and charity organisations.

Cabinet

On 28 June 2007, the day after Gordon Brown became Prime Minister, Miliband was sworn of the Privy Council and appointed Minister for the Cabinet Office and Chancellor of the Duchy of Lancaster, being promoted to the cabinet. This meant that he and his brother, Foreign Secretary David Miliband, became the first brothers to serve in a British cabinet since Edward and Oliver Stanley in 1938. He was additionally given the task of drafting Labour's manifesto for the 2010 general election.

On 3 October 2008, Miliband was promoted to become Secretary of State for the newly created Department of Energy and Climate Change in a cabinet reshuffle. On 16 October, Miliband announced that the British government would legislate to oblige itself to cut greenhouse emissions by 80% by 2050, rather than the 60% cut in carbon dioxide emissions previously announced.

In March 2009, while Secretary of State for Energy and Climate Change, Miliband attended the UK premiere of climate change film The Age of Stupid, where he was ambushed by actor Pete Postlethwaite, who threatened to return his OBE and vote for any party other than Labour if the Kingsnorth coal-fired power station were to be given the go-ahead by the government. A month later, Miliband announced to the House of Commons a change to the government's policy on coal-fired power stations, saying that any potential new coal-fired power stations would be unable to receive government consent unless they could demonstrate that they would be able to effectively capture and bury 25% of the emissions they produce immediately, with a view to seeing that rise to 100% of emissions by 2025. This, a government source told the Guardian, effectively represented "a complete rewrite of UK energy policy for the future".

Miliband represented the UK at the 2009 Copenhagen Summit, from which emerged a global commitment to provide an additional US$10 billion a year to fight the effects of climate change, with an additional $100 billion a year provided by 2020. The conference was not able to achieve a legally binding agreement. Miliband accused China of deliberately foiling attempts at a binding agreement; China explicitly denied this, accusing British politicians of engaging in a "political scheme".

During the 2009 parliamentary expenses scandal, Miliband was named by the Daily Telegraph as one of the "saints" of the scandal, due to his claiming one of the lowest amounts of expenses in the House of Commons and submitting no claims that later had to be paid back.

Leadership of the Labour Party

Leadership election

Following the formation of the Conservative–Liberal Democrat coalition government on 11 May 2010, Gordon Brown resigned as Prime Minister and Leader of the Labour Party with immediate effect. Deputy Leader Harriet Harman took over as Acting Leader and became Leader of the Opposition. On 14 May, Miliband announced that he would stand as a candidate in the forthcoming leadership election. He launched his campaign during a speech given at a Fabian Society conference and was nominated by 62 fellow Labour MPs. The other candidates were left-wing backbencher Diane Abbott, Shadow Education Secretary Ed Balls, Shadow Health Secretary Andy Burnham and Miliband's elder brother, Shadow Foreign Secretary David Miliband.

On 23 May, former Labour leader Neil Kinnock announced that he would endorse Ed Miliband's campaign, saying that he had "the capacity to inspire people" and that he had "strong values and the ability to 'lift' people". Other senior Labour figures who backed the younger Miliband included Tony Benn and former deputy leaders Roy Hattersley and Margaret Beckett. By 9 June, the deadline for entry into the leadership election, Miliband had been nominated by just over 24% of the Parliamentary Labour Party, double the threshold. By September, Miliband had received the support of six trade unions, including both Unite and UNISON, 151 of 650 Constituency Labour Parties, three affiliated socialist societies, and half of Labour MEPs.

Ed Miliband subsequently won the election, the result of which was announced on 25 September 2010, after second, third and fourth preferences votes were counted, achieving the support of 50.654% of the electoral college, defeating his brother by 1.3%. In the fourth and final stage of the redistribution of votes after three candidates had been eliminated, Ed Miliband led in the trade unions and affiliated organisations section of the electoral college (19.93% of the total to David's 13.40%), but in both the MPs and MEPs section (15.52% to 17.81%), and Constituency Labour Party section (15.20% to 18.14%), came second. In the final round, Ed Miliband won with a total of 175,519 votes to David's 147,220 votes.

Leader of Her Majesty's Opposition

On becoming Leader of the Labour Party on 25 September 2010, Miliband also became Leader of the Opposition. At 40, he was the youngest leader of the party ever. At his first Prime Minister's Questions on 13 October 2010, he raised questions about the government's announced removal of a non-means tested child benefit. In December, he appointed Tom Baldwin as his director of communications.

During the 2011 military intervention in Libya, Miliband supported UK military action against Muammar Gaddafi. Miliband spoke at a large "March for the Alternative" rally held in London on 26 March 2011 to protest against cuts to public spending, though he was criticised by some for comparing it to the anti-apartheid and American civil rights movements.

A June 2011 poll result from Ipsos MORI put Labour 2 percentage points ahead of the Conservatives, but Miliband's personal rating was low, being rated as less popular than Iain Duncan Smith at a similar stage in his leadership. The same organisation's polling did find that Miliband's personal ratings in his first full year of leadership were better than David Cameron's during his first full year as Conservative leader in 2006.

In July 2011, following the revelation that the News of the World had paid private investigators to hack into the phones of Milly Dowler, as well as the families of murder victims and deceased servicemen, Miliband called for News International chief executive Rebekah Brooks to resign, urged David Cameron to establish a public, judge-led inquiry into the scandal, and announced that he would force a Commons vote on whether to block the News International bid for a controlling stake in BSkyB. He also called for the Press Complaints Commission to be abolished – a call later echoed by Cameron and Nick Clegg – and called into question Cameron's judgement in hiring former News of the World editor Andy Coulson to be his director of communications. Cameron later took the unusual step of saying that the government would back Miliband's motion that the BSkyB bid be dropped, and an hour before Miliband's motion was due to be debated, News International announced that it would withdraw the bid.

Following the riots in England in August 2011, Miliband called for a public inquiry into the events, and insisted society had "to avoid simplistic answers". The call for an inquiry was rejected by David Cameron, prompting Miliband to say he would set up his own. In a BBC Radio 4 interview shortly after the riots, Miliband spoke of an irresponsibility that applied not only to the people involved in the riots, but "wherever we find it in our society. We've seen in the past few years...MPs' expenses, what happened in the banks". Miliband also said Labour did not do enough to tackle moral problems during its 13 years in office. In December 2011 Miliband appointed Tim Livesey, a former adviser to the Archbishop of Canterbury, to be his full-time chief of staff.

In his first speech of 2012, Miliband said that if Labour won the 2015 general election times would be difficult economically, but Labour was still the only party capable of delivering "fairness". He also said he would tackle "vested interests", citing energy and rail companies. Following the announcement in late January 2012 that the chief executive officer of the nationalised Royal Bank of Scotland, Stephen Hester, would receive a bonus worth £950,000, Miliband called the amount "disgraceful", and urged David Cameron to act to prevent the bonus. Cameron refused, saying it was a matter for the RBS board, leading Miliband to announce that Labour would force a Commons vote on whether or not the government should block it. Hester announced that he would forego his bonus, and Miliband said Labour would carry on with a Commons vote regardless, focusing instead on the bonuses of other RBS executives. Following George Galloway's unexpected win in the March by-election in Bradford West, Miliband announced he would lead an inquiry into the result, saying that it "could not be dismissed as a one-off".

In April 2012, in the midst of a debate about the nature of political party funding, Miliband called on David Cameron to institute a £5,000 cap on donations from individuals and organisations to political parties, after it had been suggested that the government favoured a cap of £50,000. On 14 July 2012, Miliband became the first Leader of the Labour Party to attend and address the Durham Miners' Gala in 23 years. In the same month, Miliband became the first British politician to be invited to France to meet the new French President, François Hollande.

On 23 January 2013, Miliband stated that he was against holding a referendum on the UK's membership of the European Union because of the economic uncertainty that it would create. On 18 March 2013, Miliband reached a deal with both Cameron and Nick Clegg on new press regulation laws following the Leveson Inquiry, which he said "satisfied the demands of protection for victims and freedom of the press". In August 2013, following the recall of Parliament to discuss an alleged chemical attack in Syria, Miliband announced that Labour would oppose any military intervention on the basis that there was insufficient evidence. David Cameron had been in favour of such action but lost the ensuing vote, making it the first time that a British prime minister had been prevented from instigating military action by parliament since 1956.

At the Labour conference in September 2013, Miliband highlighted his party's stance on the NHS and announced if elected Labour would abolish the bedroom tax. The conference included several 'signature' policies, such as strengthening the minimum wage, freezing business rates, building 200,000 houses a year, lowering the voting age to 16, and the provision of childcare by primary schools between 8am and 6pm. The policy that attracted the most attention was the commitment to help tackle the 'cost-of-living crisis' by freezing gas and electricity prices until 2017 to give time to 'reset the market' in favour of consumers. In January 2014, Miliband extended the concept of reform to include the 'big five' banks, in addition to the 'big six' utility companies, and discussed the impact of the cost-of-living on the 'squeezed middle', saying "the current cost-of-living crisis is not just about people on tax credits, zero-hour contracts and the minimum wage. It is about the millions of middle-class families who never dreamt that life would be such a struggle".

Throughout 2014, Miliband changed Labour's policy on immigration, partly in response to UKIP's performance in the European and local elections in May, and the close result in the Heywood and Middleton by-election in October. Miliband committed to increase funding for border checks, tackle exploitation and the undercutting of wages, require employers who recruit abroad to create apprenticeships, and ensure workers in public-facing roles have minimum standards of English. In November 2014, Labour announced plans to require new EU migrants wait two years before claiming benefits.

Miliband campaigned in the Scottish independence referendum with the cross-party Better Together campaign, supporting Scotland's membership of the United Kingdom. Opinion polls showed solid leads for the 'no' campaign, with a 20 point-lead on 19 August. However, by the end of the month, the lead had fallen to just 6 points, with YouGov analysis showing a big shift in support among Labour supporters. Miliband made an unplanned visit to Lanarkshire to draw a contrast between a Labour and Conservative future for Scotland within the UK. A poll on 7 September showed a 2-point lead for the 'yes' campaign, leading to a joint commitment by Miliband, Cameron and Clegg for greater devolution to Scotland through a version of home rule. The results on 19 September showed victory for the 'no' campaign, 55.3% to 44.7%.

The day after the referendum, Cameron raised the issue of 'English votes for English laws', with Miliband criticising the move as a simplistic solution to a complex problem, eventually coming out in favour for a constitutional convention to be held after the general election.

The Labour party conference in Manchester on 21–24 September occurred days after the Scottish referendum result. Miliband's conference speech was criticised, particularly after he failed to deliver sections on the deficit and immigration, after attempting to deliver the speech without notes. At the conference, Miliband pledged to focus on six national goals for Britain until 2025, including boosting pay, apprenticeships and housing; a mansion tax and levy on tobacco companies to fund £2.5 billion a year 'time to care' fund for the NHS; a commitment to raise the minimum wage to £8 or more by 2020; and a promise to lower the voting age to 16 ready for elections in 2016.

In February 2015, Labour pledged to reverse the privatisation of the railways by getting rid of the franchising system, after previously saying that they would allow the public sector to bid for franchises.

Shadow Cabinet

The first election to the Shadow Cabinet that took place under Miliband's leadership was on 7 October 2010. Ending days of speculation, David Miliband announced that he would not seek election to the Shadow Cabinet on 29 September, the day nominations closed, saying he wanted to avoid "constant comparison" with his brother Ed. The three other defeated candidates for the Labour leadership all stood in the election, though Diane Abbott failed to win enough votes to gain a place. Following the election, Miliband unveiled his Shadow Cabinet on 8 October 2010. Among others, he appointed Alan Johnson as Shadow Chancellor of the Exchequer, Yvette Cooper was chosen as Shadow Foreign Secretary, and both defeated Labour leadership candidates Ed Balls and Andy Burnham were given senior roles, becoming Shadow Home Secretary and Shadow Education Secretary respectively. Burnham was also given responsibility for overseeing Labour's election co-ordination.

Sadiq Khan, who managed Miliband's successful leadership campaign, was appointed Shadow Justice Secretary and Shadow Lord Chancellor, and continuing Deputy Leader Harriet Harman continued to shadow Deputy Prime Minister Nick Clegg, as well as being made Shadow International Development Secretary. Alan Johnson would later resign, stepping down for "personal reasons" on 20 January 2011, necessitating Miliband's first reshuffle, in which he made Balls Shadow Chancellor, Cooper Shadow Home Secretary and Douglas Alexander Shadow Foreign Secretary.

On 24 June 2011, it was reported that Miliband was seeking to change the decades-old rule that Labour's Shadow Cabinet would be elected every two years, instead wanting to adopt a system where he alone had the authority to select its members. Miliband later confirmed the story, claiming that the rule represented "a legacy of Labour's past in opposition". On 5 July, Labour MPs voted overwhelmingly by a margin of 196 to 41 to back the rule change, paving the way for NEC and conference approval, which was secured in September 2011. This made Miliband the first Labour leader to have the authority to pick his own Shadow Cabinet.
`
On 7 October 2011, Miliband reshuffled his Shadow Cabinet. John Denham, John Healey and Shaun Woodward announced that they were stepping down, while Meg Hillier, Ann McKechin and Baroness Scotland also left the Shadow Cabinet. Veteran MPs Tom Watson, Jon Trickett, Stephen Twigg and Vernon Coaker were promoted to the Shadow Cabinet, as were several of the 2010 intake, including Chuka Umunna, Margaret Curran and Rachel Reeves, with Liz Kendall and Michael Dugher given the right to attend Shadow Cabinet. Lord Wood and Emily Thornberry were also made Shadow Cabinet attendees.

On 15 May 2012, Miliband appointed Owen Smith to replace Peter Hain – who retired from frontline politics – as Shadow Welsh Secretary, and also promoted Jon Cruddas to the Shadow Cabinet, putting him in charge of overseeing Labour's ongoing policy review with a view to draft Labour's manifesto for the next election. On 4 July 2013, Miliband effectively sacked Tom Watson from the Shadow Cabinet after allegations of corruption over the selection of a parliamentary candidate for Falkirk. Watson had offered his resignation, but when Miliband was asked by a journalist specifically whether he had sacked Watson, he replied, "...I said it was right for him to go, yes."

On 7 October 2013, Miliband reshuffled his Shadow Cabinet for the third time, saying that this would be the last reshuffle before the general election. In a move similar to his 2011 reshuffle, several MPs from the 2010 intake were promoted, while more long-serving MPs were moved. Tristram Hunt and Rachel Reeves received promotions, while Liam Byrne and Stephen Twigg were among those demoted.

Miliband conducted a final mini-reshuffle ahead of the 2015 general election in November 2014, when Jim Murphy resigned as Shadow International Development Secretary to become Leader of the Scottish Labour Party.

Local and European elections

Miliband's first electoral tests as Labour Leader came in the elections to the Scottish Parliament, Welsh Assembly and various councils across England, excluding London, on 5 May 2011. The results for Labour were described as a "mixed bag", with the party performing well in Wales – falling just one seat short of an overall majority and forming the next Welsh Government on its own – and making large gains from the Liberal Democrats in northern councils, including Sheffield, Leeds, Liverpool and Manchester.

Results were less encouraging in the south of England, and results in Scotland were described as a "disaster", with Labour losing nine seats to the SNP, which went on to gain the Parliament's first ever majority. Miliband said that following the poor showings in Scotland "lessons must still be learnt".

Miliband launched Labour's campaign for the 2012 local elections with a speech in Birmingham, accusing the coalition government of "betrayal", and claiming that it "lacked the values" that Britain needed. The Labour results were described as a success, with the party building on its performance the previous year in the north of England and Wales, consolidating its position in northern cities and winning control of places such as Cardiff and Swansea. Labour performed well in the Midlands and South of England, winning control of councils including Birmingham, Norwich, Plymouth and Southampton. Labour was less successful in Scotland than England and Wales, but retained control of Glasgow despite predictions it would not. Overall, Labour gained over 800 councillors and control of 22 councils.

In April 2013, Miliband pledged ahead of the upcoming county elections that Labour would change planning laws to give local authorities greater authority to decide what shops can open in their high streets. He also said that Labour would introduce more strenuous laws relating to pay-day lenders and betting shops. Labour subsequently gained nearly 300 councillors, as well as control of Nottinghamshire and Derbyshire County Councils.

In May 2014, Miliband led Labour through the European Parliament elections, where the party increased its number of Members of the European Parliament from 13 to 20. Labour came second with 24.4% of the vote, finishing ahead of the Conservatives but behind the UKIP. This was the first time since the 1984 that the largest opposition party had failed to win the most seats in European elections. On the same day, Labour polled ahead of all other parties at the local elections, winning 31% of the vote and taking control of six additional councils.

2015 general election and resignation

On 30 March 2015, the Parliament of the United Kingdom dissolved and a general election was called for 7 May. Miliband began his campaign by launching a "manifesto for business", stating that only by voting Labour would the UK's position within the European Union be secure. Miliband subsequently unveiled five pledges at a rally in Birmingham which would form the focus of a future Labour government, specifically identifying policies on deficit reduction, living standards, the NHS, immigration controls and tuition fees. He included an additional pledge on housing and rent on 27 April. On 14 April, Labour launched its full manifesto, which Miliband said was fully funded and would require no additional borrowing. During this time an online campaign began known as Milifandom.

Throughout the campaign for the 7 May elections, Miliband insisted that David Cameron should debate him one on one as part of a televised election broadcast  in order to highlight differences in policies between the two major parties, but this was never to happen, with the pair instead being interviewed separately by Jeremy Paxman as part of the first major televised political broadcast of the election involving multiple parties.

Despite opinion polls leading up to the general election predicting a tight result, Labour decisively lost the 7 May general election to the Conservatives. Although gaining 22 seats, Labour lost all but one of its MPs in Scotland and ended up with a net loss of 26 seats, failing to win a number of key marginal seats that it had expected to win comfortably. After being returned as MP for Doncaster North, Miliband stated that it had been a "difficult and disappointing" night for Labour. Following David Cameron's success in forming a majority government, Miliband resigned as Leader of the Labour Party on 8 May, with Harriet Harman becoming acting leader while a leadership election was initiated. Jeremy Corbyn succeeded Miliband as leader.

Post-leadership

Backbencher 
As a backbencher, Miliband spoke about the need to tackle inequality and in favour of the Paris climate change agreement. In May 2016, he appeared on the BBC's Question Time, speaking in favour of Remain in the UK's EU referendum and he subsequently campaigned for a Remain vote.

In the aftermath of the referendum result, Miliband said that, although he had supported Jeremy Corbyn since his election as leader, he had "reluctantly reached the conclusion his position [was] untenable", calling for Corbyn to step down in June 2016. In the ensuing contest, Miliband supported leadership challenger Owen Smith. Miliband later admitted that he was "clearly wrong" to call for Corbyn's resignation. In September 2016, Miliband joined the editorial board of The Political Quarterly journal, an unremunerated role.

Renewing his previous stance on the issue in 2011, Miliband criticised Rupert Murdoch's bid to takeover telecommunications company Sky in December 2016, subsequently supporting an inquiry by Ofcom.

Miliband held his seat at the 2019 general election with an extremely reduced majority. After the election, it was announced that Miliband would sit on a panel of party figures to overview and investigate the electoral failure.

Return to Shadow Cabinet 
On 6 April 2020, Keir Starmer appointed Miliband to his new Shadow Cabinet, after winning the contest to become leader of the Labour Party two days before. Miliband assumed the role of Shadow Business Secretary in the new cabinet.

In September 2020, Miliband faced Prime Minister Boris Johnson during a debate on the UK Internal Market Bill, in a speech accusing him of "legislative hooliganism".

On 27 October 2021, Miliband took Prime Minister's Questions after the October 2021 budget on behalf of Keir Starmer, who had contracted COVID-19.

Policies and views

Self-described views
Miliband described himself as a new type of Labour politician, looking to move beyond the divisiveness of Blairism and Brownism, and calling for an end to the "factionalism and psychodramas" of Labour's past. He also repeatedly spoke of the need for a "new politics".

During the Labour leadership campaign, he described himself as a socialist, and spoke out against some of the actions of the Blair ministry, including criticising its record on civil liberties and foreign policy. Though he was not yet an MP at the time of the 2003 vote, Miliband was a strong critic of the Iraq War. He backed UK military action and intervention in Afghanistan and Libya respectively.

Miliband called for "responsible capitalism" when Google's Eric Schmidt commented on his corporation's non-payment of tax. He also supported making the UK's 50% top rate of tax permanent, as well as the institution of a new financial transaction tax, mutualising Northern Rock, putting limits on top salaries, scrapping tuition fees in favour of a graduate tax, implementing a living wage policy and the scrapping of the ID cards policy, and spoke in favour of a "National Care Service".

Miliband worked closely with the think tank Policy Network on the concept of predistribution as a means to tackle what he described as 'the growing crisis in living standards'. His announcement that predistribution would become a cornerstone of the UK Labour Party's economic policy was jokingly mocked by Prime Minister David Cameron during Prime Minister's Questions in the House of Commons.

Though Labour remained officially neutral, he in a personal capacity supported the ultimately unsuccessful "Yes to AV" campaign in the Alternative Vote referendum on 5 May 2011, saying that it would benefit Britain's "progressive majority". In September 2011, Miliband stated that a future Labour Government would immediately cut the cap on tuition fees for university students from £9,000 per year to £6,000, though he also stated that he remained committed to a graduate tax in the long-run. Together with Shadow Chancellor Ed Balls, Miliband also promoted a "five-point plan for jobs and growth" aimed at helping the UK economy, involving extending the bonus tax on banks pioneered by Alistair Darling, bringing forward planned long-term investment to help reduce unemployment, cutting the rate of VAT from 20% back to 17.5%, cutting VAT on home improvements to 5% for a temporary one-year period, and instigating a one-year National Insurance break to encourage employers to hire more staff.
Miliband also endorsed the Blue Labour trend in the Labour Party, founded by Maurice Glasman. This was seen to have influenced his 2011 conference speech, signalling "predatory and productive capitalism".

Miliband is progressive in regard to issues of gender and sexuality. He publicly identifies as a feminist. In March 2012, Miliband pledged his support for same sex marriage. As he signed an 'equal marriage pledge', he said, "I strongly agree gay and lesbian couples should have an equal right to marry and deserve the same recognition from the state and society as anyone else."

In June 2014, while speaking to the Labour Friends of Israel, Miliband stated that if he became Prime Minister he would seek "closer ties" with Israel and opposed the boycott of Israeli goods, saying that he would "resolutely oppose the isolation of Israel" and that nobody in the Labour Party should question Israel's right to exist. He also stated that, as a Jew and a friend of Israel, he must criticise Israel when necessary, opposing the "killing of innocent Palestinian civilians". Miliband criticised Israel for its conduct during the 2014 Israel–Gaza conflict.

Since the end of his leadership of the Labour Party, Miliband has expressed regret for not having been "radical enough" in his manifesto, and has described himself as "not following the normal route, which is to become more right wing as you get older", but instead becoming "more left wing".

On 30 April 2019, Miliband joined Caroline Lucas and Laura Sandys in calling for a Green New Deal in the UK.

Comments on other politicians

During his time as Labour leader, Miliband criticised then-Conservative Leader and Prime Minister David Cameron for "sacrificing everything on the altar of deficit reduction", and has accused him of being guilty of practising "old politics", citing alleged broken promises on areas such as crime, policing, bank bonuses, and child benefit.

Miliband was also particularly critical of former Liberal Democrat Leader and Deputy Prime Minister Nick Clegg following the Conservative–Liberal Democrat coalition agreement, accusing him of "betrayal" and of "selling-out" his party's voters. In 2010, he stated that he would demand Clegg's resignation as a precursor to any future Labour-Liberal Democrat coalition under his own leadership. In the 2011 Alternative Vote referendum campaign he refused to share a platform with Clegg, stating that he had become "too toxic" a brand and that he would harm the "Yes to AV" campaign. He shared platforms during the campaign with former Liberal Democrat Leaders Lord Ashdown and Charles Kennedy, Liberal Democrat Deputy Leader Simon Hughes, the Green Party Leader Caroline Lucas and Business Secretary Vince Cable, among others. As Labour leader, Miliband made speeches aimed at winning over disaffected Liberal Democrats, identifying a difference between the "Orange Book" Lib Dems, who were closer to the Conservatives, and Lib Dems on the centre-left, offering the latter a role in helping Labour's policy review at that time.

Following the death of former Prime Minister and Conservative Leader Margaret Thatcher in 2013, Miliband spoke in a House of Commons sitting specially convened to pay tributes to her. He noted that, although he disagreed with a few of her policies, he respected "what her death means to the many, many people who admired her". He also said that Thatcher "broke the mould" in everything she had achieved in her life, and that she had had the ability to "overcome every obstacle in her path". He had previously praised Thatcher shortly before the Labour Party Conference in September 2012 for creating an "era of aspiration" in the 1980s.

Miliband has previously spoken positively of his brother David, praising his record as Foreign Secretary, and saying that "his door was always open" following David's decision not to stand for the Shadow Cabinet in 2010. Upon David's announcement in 2013 that he would resign as a Labour MP and move to New York to head the International Rescue Committee, Miliband said that British politics would be "a poorer place" without him, and that he thought David "would once again make a contribution to British public life."

When asked to choose the greatest British Prime Minister, Miliband answered with Labour's post-war Prime Minister and longest-serving Leader, Clement Attlee. He has also spoken positively of his two immediate predecessors as Labour leader, Tony Blair and Gordon Brown, praising their leadership and records in government.

Media portrayal
Miliband was portrayed during Labour's 2015 election campaign as being genuine in his desire to improve the lives of working people and to display progression from New Labour, but was unable to defeat interpretations of him as being ineffectual, or even cartoonish in nature. Political illustrators perceived a resemblance to Wallace of the British animation Wallace and Gromit and greatly exaggerated this in caricatures; various images circulated in the press and online media of Miliband performing day-to-day activities such as eating a bacon sandwich, donating money to a beggar, and giving a kiss to his wife, all while displaying apparently awkward facial expressions. In a March 2015 Newsnight election debate, he was challenged by Jeremy Paxman as to whether or not he was 'tough enough' to be Prime Minister, responding, "Hell yes, I'm tough enough", in reference to his reluctance to support air strikes against extremist targets in Syria.

Personal life
Miliband is married to Justine Thornton, a High Court Judge. The couple met in 2002 and lived together in north London before becoming engaged in March 2010 and wed in May 2011. They have two sons, Daniel, born 2009, and Samuel, born 2010.

Miliband is of Jewish heritage — the first ethnically Jewish leader of the Labour Party — and describes himself as a Jewish atheist. After marrying Thornton in a civil ceremony on 27 May 2011, he paid tribute to his Jewish heritage by following the tradition of breaking a glass. In 2012, Miliband wrote, "Like many others from Holocaust families, I have a paradoxical relationship with this history. On one level I feel intimately connected with it – this happened to my parents and grandparents. On another, it feels like a totally different world."

Styles
Mr. Edward Samuel Miliband (1969–2005)
Mr. Edward Samuel Miliband MP (2005–2007)
The Right Honourable Edward Samuel Miliband MP (2007–present)

Other works

In June 2017, Miliband guest-presented Jeremy Vine's BBC Radio 2 show.

Miliband co-hosts a popular podcast, entitled Reasons to be Cheerful, with radio presenter Geoff Lloyd. In November 2017, Miliband and Lloyd appeared as joint guests on Richard Herring's Leicester Square Theatre Podcast.

Notes

References

Sources

Further reading
Hasan, Mehdi, Macintyre, James (2011) "Ed: The Milibands and the making of a Labour leader" Biteback,

External links

Profile at Labour.org.uk (archived)

Ed Miliband collected news and commentary at The Telegraph

|-

|-

|-

|-

|-

|-

|-

|-

|-

 
1969 births
Living people
Alumni of Corpus Christi College, Oxford
Alumni of the London School of Economics
Atheist feminists
British people of Belgian-Jewish descent
British Secretaries of State
Chancellors of the Duchy of Lancaster
English atheists
English feminists
English people of Belgian descent
English people of Polish-Jewish descent
English socialists
Fellows of Corpus Christi College, Oxford
Jewish atheists
Jewish British politicians
Jewish feminists
Jewish socialists
Labour Party (UK) MPs for English constituencies
Leaders of the Labour Party (UK)
Male feminists
Members of the Privy Council of the United Kingdom
People from the London Borough of Camden
Politics of Doncaster
English socialist feminists
UK MPs 2005–2010
UK MPs 2010–2015
UK MPs 2015–2017
UK MPs 2017–2019
UK MPs 2019–present
20th-century atheists
21st-century atheists